The Liberator is a 2013 Spanish–Venezuelan historical drama film directed by Alberto Arvelo, starring Édgar Ramírez as Simón Bolívar. It was screened in the Special Presentation section at the 2013 Toronto International Film Festival. It was selected as the Venezuelan entry for the Best Foreign Language Film at the 87th Academy Awards, making the January Shortlist.

Cast

 Édgar Ramírez as Simón Bolívar
 María Valverde as Maria Teresa Rodríguez del Toro
 Juana Acosta as Manuela Sáenz
 Danny Huston as Martin Torkington
 Erich Wildpret as Antonio José de Sucre
 Alejandro Furth as Rafael Urdaneta
 Orlando Valenzuela as Francisco de Paula Santander
 Iwan Rheon as Daniel O'Leary
 Gary Lewis as James Rooke
 Imanol Arias as Juan Domingo Monteverde
 Juvel Vielma as José Antonio Páez
 Carlos Julio Molina as José Félix Ribas
 Manuel Porto as Francisco de Miranda
 Francisco Denis as Simón Rodríguez
 Zenaida Gamboa as Hipólita
 Andrés Gertrúdix as Prince Fernando
 Elisa Sednaoui as Fanny du Villars
 Leandro Arvelo as Fernando Bolívar
 Ximo Solano as Francisco Vinoni
 Steve Wilcox as Black Horseman
 Eric Toala as Simón Bolívar (kid)

Release
The film debuted on 9 September 2013 at the Toronto International Film Festival and opened in its home country of Venezuela on 24 July 2014. The film was released by Cohen Media Group on Blu-ray Disc and DVD on 10 March 2015.

See also
 List of submissions to the 87th Academy Awards for Best Foreign Language Film
 List of Venezuelan submissions for the Academy Award for Best Foreign Language Film

References

External links
 Official site
 
 
 
 
 

2013 films
2013 drama films
2010s historical drama films
Films set in Madrid
Films set in Paris
Films set in Venezuela
Films set in Jamaica
Films set in Colombia
Films shot in Venezuela
English-language Venezuelan films
English-language Spanish films
Spanish historical drama films
Spanish epic films
2010s Spanish-language films
Cultural depictions of Simón Bolívar
Venezuelan drama films